The 1987 Australian Grand Prix was a Formula One motor race held at Adelaide on 15 November 1987. It was the sixteenth and final race of the 1987 Formula One World Championship.

The 82-lap race was won by Austrian driver Gerhard Berger, who started from pole position and led every lap in his Ferrari. Brazilian Ayrton Senna finished second in his Lotus-Honda but was subsequently disqualified, thus promoting Berger's Italian teammate Michele Alboreto to second and the Benetton-Ford of Belgian Thierry Boutsen to third.

Background
Nigel Mansell was still recovering from his accident in the previous race in Japan and so Riccardo Patrese, who had already signed for Williams to partner Mansell in 1988, was given permission by Brabham owner Bernie Ecclestone to stand in for the Briton in this race; he was replaced at Brabham by Formula 3000 champion Stefano Modena, making his Formula One debut.

Qualifying report
Despite being ill during qualifying, Gerhard Berger took pole position in his Ferrari by 0.7 seconds from Alain Prost in the McLaren. In his final race for Williams Nelson Piquet took third, with compatriot Ayrton Senna fourth in his final race for Lotus; they were followed by Thierry Boutsen in the Benetton and Michele Alboreto in the second Ferrari. Patrese was seventh in the second Williams, with Stefan Johansson in the second McLaren, Teo Fabi in the second Benetton and Andrea de Cesaris in the Brabham completing the top ten. Modena took 15th, just behind Satoru Nakajima in the second Lotus.

Qualifying classification

Race report
At the green light, Piquet darted past Berger to take the lead into the first chicane, whilst Alessandro Nannini in the Minardi was out immediately after crashing into the wall on the exit. A confident Berger, fresh from his victory in the previous race in Japan, re-passed Piquet at Wakefield Corner and began to pull away from the field.

Early retirements included Philippe Streiff spinning off in his Tyrrell on lap 7 and Nakajima suffering a hydraulics failure on lap 23. Modena's debut ended on lap 32 when he stopped in the pits due to exhaustion.

The battle for second between Piquet, Prost, Alboreto and Senna changed little until lap 35, when Piquet pitted for tyres and dropped to sixth. On lap 42, Prost found himself baulked by former teammate René Arnoux in the Ligier on the pit straight and Alboreto slipped through, before Senna powered past both the McLaren and the Ferrari.

Attrition kicked in as the race continued, with brakes in particular becoming a big issue. Fabi was the first brake-related retirement on lap 47, followed by Johansson on lap 49 and Prost on lap 54. Piquet's brakes also failed on lap 59, leaving Berger, Senna and Alboreto as the top three followed by Boutsen and Patrese.

In the latter stages of the race Senna made a charge, closing to within eight seconds of Berger, before the Austrian pulled away again, setting the fastest lap of the race on lap 72. Berger crossed the finish line just under 35 seconds ahead of Senna, with Alboreto the only other driver on the lead lap and Boutsen, Jonathan Palmer in the second Tyrrell and Yannick Dalmas in the Larrousse completing the top six after Patrese suffered a late oil leak.

In post-race scrutineering it was discovered that the brake ducts on Senna's Lotus were oversized, resulting in his disqualification from the race. Alboreto was duly promoted to second, giving Ferrari a 1-2 finish, with Boutsen third, Palmer fourth, Dalmas fifth and Roberto Moreno sixth, scoring the AGS team's first World Championship point. The only other classified finishers were Christian Danner in the Zakspeed, de Cesaris and Patrese. Dalmas did not receive the two points for his fifth place, as he was driving Larrousse's second car and the team had officially entered only one car for the championship.

Race classification

* Dalmas did not receive points towards the Drivers' Championship or the Jim Clark Trophy, as he was driving Larrousse-Lola's second car and the team had officially entered only one car for the entire championship.

Championship standings after the race
Bold text indicates the World Champions.

Drivers' Championship standings

Constructors' Championship standings

Jim Clark Trophy standings

Colin Chapman Trophy standings

References

Grand Prix
Australian Grand Prix
Australian Grand Prix
Motorsport in Adelaide
Australian Grand Prix